b-flower are a Japanese indie pop band formed in Kyoto, Japan, in the late 1980s.  The band would be put under such banners as ネオアコースティック ("Neo-Acoustic") in Japan (see below), which refers to the sound heavily influenced by the British independent music scene of the 1980s, most notably alternative rock.  ネオアコ ("Neo-Aco"), as often dubbed, was popular with the country's young generations in the 1990s.

The band's name comes from a poem written by Richard Brautigan, in which he compared roadside drunks to exotic flowers. This led to the name "Brautigan Flower", which eventually became "b-flower". b-flower's work often contains references to Brautigan's writing.

"Even NME, not the easiest to please, no doubt, praised their tunes and performance full of sensitive beauty.  Hideshi Hachino's witty lyrics in Japanese (which, when they debuted, stood out as a fresh delight among their folk rock/ 'neo-acoustic' contemporaries, most of whose lyrics were done in English) and crystal vocals are still the magnet for fans, though most of their albums are out of issue. "

"B-FLOWER : Stay Still (Sugarfrost) - Gorgeous.  Beautiful beyond belief, a piano-based ballad, sung in Japanese, with a melody that covers you like the softest of eiderdowns.  b-flower are five young boys from Kyoto with a captivating sense of passion, nestling somewhere between the gentle side of REM and the trance-like qualities of Nico on a good day.  Mind you, I'm a sucker for anything sung in either French or Japanese, the two most soothing and lyrical languages on the planet.  Surprise of the week, nay, year."  (NME, June 19, 1993).

History
They first came to critical attention in Japan in 1990 when their self-produced debut EP, 『日曜日のミツバチ (Nichiyo-bi no Mitsubachi)』("Nothing On Sunday") came out.  Two full-length albums and another EP later, they contributed two tracks to "The Birth of The True," a compilation album featuring a number of then hopeful British and Japanese indie pop bands, which was released in the U.K. in March 1992 by Sugarfrost Records from Liverpool in tandem with ¡Por supuesto! Records, their Japanese counterpart, and played on the air and praised by John Peel in May.  The band's two contributions, the only tracks sung in Japanese in the entire album, found surprisingly warm critical reception, represented by "the best of all" from NME and Melody Maker in their August issues.

Following that the band released two 7" vinyl singles, "Stay Still" in 1993 and "Strings" in 1994, via the independent English label.  Both were performed entirely in Japanese, yet enjoyed critical acclaim from the afore-mentioned two reviews (as quoted above).  Back in Japan, Toshiba EMI began releasing their work, a total of five albums, including their eponymous album in 1998.  Around 2000 the band stopped releasing albums even though there were releases from some of the members in 1999 and 2000.

After a 10-year hiatus, in November 2010 frontman Hachino and drummer Okabe released a debut single, "Tokyo, Snowscape" under a moniker of Livingstone Daisy, joined by ambient musician Hosomi Sakana.  "This World of Sorrow" was their second release in February, followed by "June Song" in September, with debut album "33 Minutes Before the Light" released in March 2013.

In May 2012 the band ended their decade-long 'hibernation' by digitally releasing a brand new single, "After All This Time", whose original Japanese title is 『つまらない大人になってしまった (Tsumaranai Otona ni Natte Shimatta)』("I've Become a Boring Adult").

Band members 
 Hideshi Hachino（八野英史） – vocals and guitar
 Wataru Okabe （岡部わたる）– drums
 Masaru Miya （宮大）– bass
 Hiroshi Suzuki （鈴木浩）– guitar

Discography

Albums
 ペニーアーケードの年 Penny Arcade no Toshi (In the Penny Arcade) (Por supuesto, 1991)
 ムクドリの眼をした少年 Mukudori no Me o Shita Shonen (A Boy with Gray Starling Eyes) (Por supuesto, 1992)
 World's End Laundry (Suite supuesto/Toshiba EMI, 1993)
 Clover Chronicles I (Suite supuesto/Toshiba EMI, 1994) - 7-track album
 Grocery Andromeda (Suite supuesto/Toshiba EMI, 1995)
 Clockwise (Suite supuesto/Toshiba EMI, 1996)
 b-flower (EMI Music Japan, 1998)
 Paint My Soul (Agent Con-Sipio, 1999) - 7-track album

EPs
 日曜日のミツバチ Nichiyobi no Mitsubachi (Nothing on Sunday) (Seeds Records, 1990)
 Nobody Knows This Is Nowhere (Por supuesto, 1991)

Singles
 舟 Fune (Boat) (Suite supuesto, 1993)
 雪の朝ロビンのように Yuki no Asa, Robin no Yoni (Morning in Snow, Like a Robin)  (Suite supuesto, 1994)
 North Marine Drive  (Suite supuesto, 1995)
 太陽の雫 Taiyo no Shizuku (A Drop of the Sun)  (Suite supuesto, 1995)
 Jet Jet Coaster  (Suite supuesto, 1996)
 明星 Myojo (Venus)  (Suite supuesto, 1996)
 時空のバタフライ Jiku no Batafurai (Butterfly of Time and Space)  (Suite supuesto, 1997)
 蛍 Hotaru (Firefly)  (Suite supuesto, 1997)
 地の果てより発つ Chi no Hate Yori Tatsu (Depart from Land's End)  (Suite supuesto, 1998)
 つまらない大人になってしまった Tsumaranai Otona ni Natte Shimatta (I've Become a Boring Adult) aka "After All This Time" (Seeds Records, 2012); available from iTunes Store US, Canada, Australia, NZ & EU
 永遠の59秒目 aka "The Eternal 59th Second" / 動物園へ行こうよ aka "On The Eastbound Bus" (Seeds Records, 2014); available from iTunes Store US, Canada, Australia, NZ & EU

UK 7" Vinyl Singles
 Stay Still (Sugarfrost Records, 1993)
 Strings (Sugarfrost Records, 1994)

Compilations
 The Birth of The True  (Sugarfrost Records UK + Por supuesto  JP, 1992) - UK/JP indie pop compilation album
 Border - A Tribute to Motoharu Sano  (Bounce Records/Pioneer LDC, 1996)

Others
 Boat - LP originally scheduled for release in the United Kingdom under Sugarfrost Records, but eventually discarded.
As Five Beans Chup 
 夏休み Natsuyasumi - Summer Feeling  (Seeds Records, 1999)
 The First Day of Summer  (Seeds Records, 2000)
As Humming Toad - Okabe's solo project
 Love Wonderland  (Seeds Records, 1999)
 Love Under the Lily Pad  (Seeds Records, 2000)
As Livingstone Daisy
 どこにも行けないでいる "Tokyo, Snowscape" (Seeds Records, 2010) - single; available from iTunes Store US, Canada, Australia, NZ & EU
 この悲しい世界 "This World of Sorrow" (Seeds Records, 2010) - single; available from iTunes Store US, Canada, Australia, NZ & EU
 June Song (Seeds Records, 2010) - single; available from iTunes Store US, Canada, Australia, NZ & EU
 33 Minutes Before the Light (Seeds Records, 2013) - album; released throughout Japan in CD format, and available worldwide through iTunes Store and Amazon MP3. It is also available on music streaming service Spotify.

References

External links
 Frontman Hachino interviewed by Cloudberry Records (2011) (in English)
 Hachino's Blog (in Japanese)

Japanese rock music groups
Japanese indie rock groups
Japanese indie pop groups
Shibuya-kei musicians
Musical groups established in 1985
Musical groups from Kyoto Prefecture
1985 establishments in Japan